Norena Shopland is a Welsh historian and writer who specialises in (LGBTQ+)  research and history. She has featured on lists of Welsh LGBTQ+ people of note, and  gives talks, lectures and workshops on Welsh heritage and LGBT+ history. She has organised, curated and consulted on exhibitions and events within the heritage sector in Wales.

Shopland is one of the founders of the network forum Hanes LHDT+ Cymru / LGBTQ+ Research Group Wales, which unites and supports LGBTQ+ history of Wales enthusiasts and researchers.

She is the diversity officer for the Women's History Network.

Biography
Born in Cardiff, Shopland initially trained as an archaeologist, and performed various jobs internationally for organisations including The British Museum. She was awarded a grant by English Heritage to pursue an MA in Artefacts at University College London (UCL) and subsequently wrote two books Archaeological Finds: An Identification Guide and An Archaeological Finds Manual.

Shopland describes her interest in  LGBTQ+  history as ‘inevitable’, and went on to work for the Lesbian and Gay Newsmedia Archive ( LAGNA) as well as on the Reassessing What We Collect project for the Museum of London, and an oral history on women with HIV/AIDS at Positively Women in association with the British Library.

When Shopland moved back to her native land of Wales, she focused on Welsh LGBTQ+ history.

Shopland has worked with Amgueddfa Cymru/National Museum Wales and many other museums and archives raising awareness on the inclusion of equality and diversity in their collections. She also worked with Cardiff Story Museum on the Celebrating LGBTQ+ Cardiff exhibition.

She frequently travels to give talks,  including a presentation at the House of Commons to commemorate the 50th anniversary of the Sexual Offences Act (1967) and to make TV and Radio appearances.

Contribution to Welsh LGBT+ history and heritage
Shopland's first involvement in this sector was for Welsh Pride, a 2012 initiative funded by the National Heritage Lottery Fund (NLHF) the first of its kind to focus exclusively on LGBTQ+ history in relation to Wales. John Davies, the Welsh historian, gave his first speech on gay history during the event. Shopland asked the National Poet of Wales, Gillian Clarke, if she would write what became the first poem that a National Poet or Poet Laureate of any country in the world had written celebrating the LGBTQ+ people of their country. Clarke took her inspiration from the Ladies of Llangollen, to write Sarah at Plas Newydd, July 5th 1788, which appears in her collection 'Ice.The project created a timeline of notable Welsh LGBTQ+ history dates, people, allies and events that Shopland resurrected and published as an e-magazine with funding from Rhondda Cynon Taff (RCT) Pride in 2020.

In  2018 with co-author Dr. Daryl Leeworthy, Shopland produced a research guide for Glamorgan archives entitled Queering Glamorgan. This is available as free download and provides a guide to searching archives for LGBTQ+ historical material.

Shopland published '''A Practical Guide to searching LGBTQIA records with Routledge in 2020. This led to an invitation to collaborate with CILIP at their 2021 Festival of Pride and Knowledge event.

Using the methodologies outlined in 'Queering Glamorgan' and 'A Practical Guide...' , Shopland demonstrated how they could be applied to other diverse areas, outlined in her article for the History Matters Journal. This was demonstrated in work with Race Council Cymru on their Windrush Cymru project, that coincided with the 50th anniversary of the arrival of HMS Windrush to the UK. The exhibition launched at St. Fagans, and toured other venues in Wales.

In 2021 Shopland was commissioned by the Welsh Government to deliver LGBTQ+ language and history training for all local museum, libraries, and archives in Wales.

Shopland also writes on Welsh women's history. Her most recent work led to the opening of the exhibition Tip Girls in September 2021 at the National Coal Museum (Big Pit),  highlighting the experience of Women both underground and overground in the coal industry.

Shopland was interviewed for International Women's day 2023 by Wales Online, where she described the difficulties of researching lesbian history, and the disparity of recognition between men and women. The article concluded with a brief summary of the life of Cranogwen, one of the women featured in her 2017 book, 'Forbidden Lives'. 

Recognition
Shopland featured on the Wales Pinc List (an annual list compiled by Walesonline of the most influential LGBT persons in Wales) in 2019, 2020, 2021 & 2022 

She was highlighted by Walesonline as one of Wales’ most influential gay women during Lesbian Visibility Week in 2021

For International Women's Day 2020, Wales Arts Review writers included Shopland in a list that suggested 100 Welsh women who were sufficiently interesting or inspiring to merit a follow on Twitter. Shopland has contributed articles on Heritage topics for Wales Arts Review, such as Amgueddfa Cymru - National Museum Wales Queer Tour  which invited visitors to join a tour to view the permanent collection through  a Queer lens.

Shopland is included in the Women's Equality Network (WEN) Wales 100+ Welsh Women list which credits brilliant Welsh Women both past and present.

A regular contributor to LGBTQ+ History Month, Shopland wrote a guest blog for Llwydroeth Cymru/Welsh Government in 2018, in which she wrote about her motivation for researching and writing Forbidden Lives, concluding that 'Because history and politics aside, they're rattling good stories - and after all, everyone loves a good story!' Shopland also wrote a guest blog for the Amgueddfa Cymru on the 'Ladies of Llangollen', who had featured in one of the stories from 'Forbidden Lives'. Another story from the book discusses the academic and historian John Boswell and Gerallt Cymro, whose Topographia Hibernica was cited by Boswell in his controversial last book, Same-Sex Unions in Pre-Modern Europe (1994). Shopland wrote in defence of Boswell for The Gay and Lesbian Review Worldwide Shopland was interviewed for Celtic Life International Magazine in August 2021 for an article entitled 'The Celtic Rainbow'''  which discussed LGBTQ+ history across the Celtic nations.

Following publication of 'A History of Women in Mens Clothes', Shopland wrote a guest blog for the Parliamentary archives.

On March 12, 2022 a new exhibition entitled 'Trawsnewid' (Transformation) opened at the National Waterfront Museum in Swansea, honouring Welsh LGBTQ+ people and their culture. A new portrait of Shopland was displayed as part of an exhibit of 12 portraits by the artist Aled Wyn Williams. Each portrait showing someone who has an 'active and positive' influence within Wales' LGBT+ community.

Published works

TV and Radio appearances 
These are some of Shopland's media appearances that are still available on line:

 BBC Radio Wales – The Story of LGBT Wales (2017)
 Radio Cardiff - Forbidden Lives (2017)
 BBC Radio Wales - Sunday Supplement (2018)
 ITV Wales - LGBTQ+ history: Celebrating 18 years of Section 28 repeal (20211)
 BBC One - Dark Land: 'The Hunt for Wales' Worst Serial Killer' (2022)

References

Year of birth missing (living people)
Living people
21st-century Welsh historians
LGBT historians
Welsh women historians
Historians of LGBT topics
Writers from Cardiff
Employees of the British Museum